Carex tumulicola, the splitawn sedge foothill sedge,  or previously Berkeley sedge, is a sedge member of the family Cyperaceae.

Description
Carex tumulicola is found in western North America, from British Columbia to California,. It is found in meadows and open woodlands, below .

Cultivation
Carex tumulicola is cultivated in the horticulture trade and widely available as a (grass-like) ornamental grass for: traditional and natural landscape drought-tolerant water-conserving lawns and small 'garden-meadows,' native plant and habitat gardens; and various types of municipal, commercial, and agency sustainable landscape and restoration projects.

Similar species
Plants grown in the nursery trade are often mislabeled with botanical and common names of similar appearing Carex spp. - while the subtle distinctions are currently [2010] reclarified-assigned by botanists. For example, one considered the species to be closely related to Carex hookeriana, and others to Carex pansa.

References

External links
 Jepson Manual treatment - Carex tumulicola
USDA: Carex tumulicola
Carex tumulicola - Photo Gallery

tumulicola
Flora of British Columbia
Flora of California
Flora of Oregon
Flora of Washington (state)
Flora of the Sierra Nevada (United States)
Flora of the West Coast of the United States
Plants described in 1907
Taxa named by Kenneth Kent Mackenzie
Garden plants of North America
Drought-tolerant plants
Groundcovers
Flora without expected TNC conservation status